Konrad Forenc (born 17 July 1992) is a Polish professional footballer who plays as a goalkeeper for Polish side Korona Kielce.

References

External links
  
 

1992 births
Living people
People from Oława
Polish footballers
Poland youth international footballers
Association football goalkeepers
Ekstraklasa players
I liga players
II liga players
III liga players
Zagłębie Lubin players
Korona Kielce players
Flota Świnoujście players
Calisia Kalisz players